State Route 358 (SR 358) is a  north–south state highway in the northern portion of the U.S. state of Ohio.

This two-lane state highway was created in the middle of the 1930s. Throughout its history, the primary purpose of SR 358 has been to provide state highway access to Camp Perry.

Route description
SR 358 exists entirely within Erie Township in the central portion of Ottawa County.  It begins at a T-intersection with SR 163 east of Oak Harbor, opposite the Port Clinton Golf Course, which is situated on the north banks of the Portage River.  The highway crosses over the Norfolk Southern Railway, and passes by a mix of woods and fields on the short journey up to its endpoint at SR 2, along a multi-lane stretch of the major state route opposite of the main entrance into Camp Perry.

This state highway is not included as a part of the National Highway System.

History
The SR 358 designation was applied in 1934. For two years prior to its numbering, the route existed as an unnumbered state-maintained road. The highway has maintained a brief routing through the central portion of Ottawa County throughout its lifetime. In addition, the entire length of SR 358 has been paved since its inception.

Major intersections

See also

References

External links

358
Transportation in Ottawa County, Ohio
State highways in the United States shorter than one mile